Rhombotin-1 is a protein that in humans is encoded by the LMO1 gene.

LMO1 encodes a cysteine-rich, two LIM domain transcriptional regulator. It is mapped to an area of consistent chromosomal translocation in chromosome 11, disrupting it in T-cell leukemia, although more rarely than the related gene, LMO2 is disrupted.

Interactions
LMO1 has been shown to interact with GATA3 and TAL1.

References

Further reading